Cactus Beach is a beach located 21 km south of Penong in South Australia. It is a renowned surfing location with two left-hand and one right-hand surfing breaks.

References

  

Beaches of South Australia
Great Australian Bight
Nullarbor Plain
Surfing locations in South Australia